Philip Konrad Marheineke (May 1, 1780, Hildesheim – May 31, 1846, Berlin), was a  German Protestant church leader within the Evangelical Church in Prussia.

Life
He was born at Hildesheim, Bishopric of Hildesheim, and studied at the University of Göttingen. In 1805 he was appointed professor extraordinarius of philosophy at Erlangen; in 1807 he moved to Heidelberg. In 1811 he became professor ordinarius at Frederick William University, Berlin, where from 1820 he was also preacher at Trinity Church and worked with Schleiermacher. When he died he was a member of the supreme consistorial council.

Works
At first influenced by Schelling, Marheineke found a new master in G. W. F. Hegel, and came to be regarded as the leader of the Hegelian Right. He sought to defend and explain all the orthodox doctrines of the Church in an orthodox way in the terms of Hegel's philosophy. 

Marheineke's developed views on dogmatics are given in the third edition (1847) of his Die Grundlehren der christlichen Dogmatik als Wissenschaft. When he published the first edition (1819) he was still under the influence of Schelling; the second edition (1827) marked his change of view. His works on symbolics show profound scholarship, keen critical insight, and rare impartiality. The Christliche Symbolik (1810-1814) has been pronounced his masterpiece.

His other works include Institutiones symbolicae (1812; 3rd ed., 1830), Geschichte der deutschen Reformation (1816; 2nd ed., 18311834); Die Reformation, ihre Entstehung und Verbreitung in Deutschland (1846; 2nd ed., 1858), and the posthumous Theol. Vorlesungen (1847-1849).

He co-edited Hegel's posthumous Werke series (1832-1845) and an 1840 edition of Lectures on the Philosophy of Religion.

References
 This work in turn cites:
Frédéric Auguste Lichtenberger, History of German theology in the nineteenth century (1889).
Émile-Alfred Weber, Le système dogmatique de Philippe Conrad Marheineke (1857).
Otto Pfleiderer, The development of theology in Germany since Kant; and its progress in Great Britain since 1825 (1890).

1780 births
1846 deaths
19th-century German Protestant theologians
Hegelian philosophers
Presidents of the Humboldt University of Berlin
University of Göttingen alumni
Academic staff of Heidelberg University